JetAudio is a shareware media player application for Microsoft Windows and Android released in 1998, that offers  playback options for a wide range of multimedia file formats.

JetAudio for Android is available as a free, “Basic” version and a paid “Plus” version, which removed advertising banners and provides more bands and the ability to display unsynchronized lyrics to the music. 

JetAudio offers functions such as: music and video playback, metadata editing, CD ripping and burning, data conversion, sound recording and Internet radio broadcasting. It also includes numerous sound effects. 

The commercial “Plus VX” version of the application includes unlocked sound enhancement algorithms and a wide range of file format support, as well as the ability to transcode more than 30 seconds of video files.

Interface

JetAudio’s user interface is similar to earlier versions of Winamp in that it features separate windows for: playback, playlist and music library. Like Winamp, JetAudio can be minimized to a toolbar ( “Windowshade Mode”) by pressing the “Toolbar Mode ON/OFF” button in the upper right portion of the Main Window.

The interface includes a 10-band spectrum visualization which doubles as an equalizer. Different implementations of this spectrum visualization can be found in the Main Window, the Media Center, the Video Window, the Lyrics Viewer and the External Spectrum Viewer.

Windows
The JetAudio interface comprises the following windows:
 The Main Window
 The Media Center
 The Video Window
 The Lyrics Viewer
 The External Spectrum Viewer

Features

File format support
JetAudio supports all major audio and video file formats, including or audio: MP3, AAC, FLAC and Ogg Vorbis, Monkey’s Audio, True Audio, Musepack and WavPack 

For video: H.264, MPEG-4, MPEG-2, MPEG-1, WMV and Ogg Theora.

Sound effects and enhancements
JetAudio features a number of built-in sound effects, including:
 A 10-band non-parametric equalization filter
 BBE (exciter) and BBE ViVA (spatializer) sound effects
 “X-Bass” and “X-Surround”
 “Wide”
 Reverb
 Time stretching
 Pitch change
 A variety of other special effects, including:
 “Flange”
 “Invert Flange”
 “Robot 1”
 “Robot 2”
 “Slow chorus”
 “Phase shift”
 “Invert Phase Shift”

Music visualization
Like many other media player applications, JetAudio offers the option of displaying an animated visualization synchronized with the music: MilkDrop, PixelTrip, Space and Synesthesia. Additional visualization plugins can be downloaded from external providers.

Lyric support
JetAudio has the ability to display both synchronized and unsynchronized lyrics to the music. Lyrics are displayed in the dedicated Lyrics Viewer window, along with the album art of the file and optionally a spectrum visualization.

Plugins
JetAudio supports most Winamp plug-ins.

Other features
JetAudio offers: bookmarking the current position in a song, looping a section of a song, a dropdown on-screen display with configurable content and a configurable “sleep timer” for shutting down the computer after a set period of playback.

JetAudio for Android

On ,  “JetAudio for Android,” mobile version was released.

History
JetAudio was first released in July 1997.

JetAudio 4

JetAudio 4’s graphical user interface was designed to look like a high-powered stereo rack and installed with an on-screen equalizer and remote control.

JetAudio 5
JetAudio 5, released in 2002, saw a major overhaul of the entire user interface and added support for skins.

JetAudio 6
JetAudio 6 was released in 2004.

JetAudio 7
JetAudio 7 (now also known as Cowon Media Center) was the first version of JetAudio to include BBE sound enhancement algorithms. The Consumers' Institute of New Zealand evaluated the Basic version and remarked that it “doesn’t have a plug-in for Firefox compatibility”, but judged the range of video and audio file formats supported as “good”.

JetAudio 8
JetAudio 8 is the first version of JetAudio to be fully compatible with Windows 7. Some of the new features in JetAudio 8 are:
 Conversion support for FLV & MKV files
 Enhanced skins
 DXVA subtitle support
 New file association method for Windows Vista and Windows 7
 PAL/NTSC option for video conversion

JetAudio 8.1 Preview
New features introduced in the Preview include:
 Menus of MC/Playlist were changed
 Playcount column added in MC
 Convert Path : change path of files in media library/playlist (useful when move files to different drive/computer)
 Convert ID3 tag : change ID3 tag charset to unicode
 Modify file path when export to PLS/M3U
 List with Thumbnail mode for MC/Playlist
 Pause while converting audio

JetAudio for Android

JetVideo

On , Cowon announced the release of JetVideo, a media player program with features which partially overlap with those of JetAudio. Like JetAudio, it relies on external codecs (such as those included in the K-Lite Codec Pack) for some of its data decoding.

See also
 Cowon
 Comparison of video player software
 List of audio conversion software

References

  Francesco Caccavella (8 January 2006), Sul web con voce e musica Come creare una radio online, la Repubblica
  רוני שני, JetAudio 6 Basic JetAudio 6 Basic (review), Ynet, 15 May 2005

External links
 

Android media players
Windows media players
Windows multimedia software
Android (operating system) software